Aethusa cynapium (fool's parsley, fool's cicely, or poison parsley) is an annual (rarely biennial) herb in the flowering plant family Apiaceae, native to Europe, western Asia, and northwest Africa. It is the only member of the genus Aethusa. It is related to hemlock and water-dropwort, and like them it is poisonous, though less so than hemlock. It has been introduced into many other parts of the world and is a common weed in cultivated ground.

Description

Toxicity
Poisoning from fool's parsley results in symptoms of heat in the mouth and throat and a post-mortem examination has shown redness of the lining membrane of the gullet and windpipe and slight congestion of the duodenum and stomach. Some toxins are destroyed by drying, and indeed, hay containing the plant is not poisonous.

References

External links

Parsley, Fool's

Apioideae
Plants described in 1753
Taxa named by Carl Linnaeus